Hang Tuah Stadium was formerly a multi-use stadium in Pekanbaru, Riau, Indonesia. It was normally used for football matches and as the home venue for PSPS Pekanbaru of the Liga Indonesia. The stadium had a capacity of 5,000 spectators.

In 2000, the stadium was demolished due to the expansion of Mosque An-Nur as well as the development a public park surrounding the mosque.

References

External links
Stadium information 

Pekanbaru
Football venues in Indonesia
Buildings and structures in Riau